Malaysia participated in the 2017 Asian Winter Games in Sapporo and Obihiro, Japan from February 19 to 26. The country is scheduled to compete with thirty-six athletes in three sports (four disciplines).

Competitors
The following table lists the Malaysian delegation per sport and gender.

Alpine skiing

Malaysia is scheduled to compete in alpine skiing for the first time at the Asian Winter Games. The team consists of two male athletes.

Men

Figure skating

Malaysia is scheduled to compete in the figure skating competitions.

Men's single

Women's single

Ice hockey

Malaysia has entered a men's hockey team. The team will compete in division two. Malaysia finished in fifth place (15th place overall) in division 2 of the competition.

Men's tournament

Malaysia was represented by the following 22 athletes:

Lee Thien-ian (G)
Shahrul Shukor (G)
Azlly Tengku (G)
Hariz Mohammad (D)
Hisham Mohammad (D)
Moi Jia-yung (D)
Azman Muhammad (D)
Shaharudin Muhammad  (D)
Bin Reezman (D)
Yap Eu-jin (D)
Aqfar Abulais (F)
Darshen Chelliah (F)
Aiman Fadzul (F)
Khoo Seng-chee (F)
Bryan Lim (F)
Loke Ban-kin (F)
Low Jun-ming (F)
Anjam Mohd (F)
Brandon Tan (F)
Stephen Santhanasamy (F)
Syed Shahabuddin (F)
Yow Cheong-jun (F)

Legend: G = Goalie, D = Defense, F = Forward
Group B

Short track speed skating

Malaysia is scheduled to compete in Short track speed skating for the first time at the Asian Winter Games.

Men

Women

References

Nations at the 2017 Asian Winter Games
Asian Winter Games
Malaysia at the Asian Winter Games